Máté Kiss (born 30 April 1991, in Győr) is a Hungarian football player who currently plays for Győri ETO FC.

Career
Kiss began his career with Győri ETO FC and was in 2008 promoted to the senior team; he gave his debut on 10 April 2009 against MTK Hungária FC.

International career
He presented his country at 2009 FIFA U-20 World Cup in Egypt. He played three games and his sole goal scored became the Goal of the Tournament.

Club statistics

Updated to games played as of 11 May 2014.

Honours
 FIFA U-20 World Cup:
Third place: 2009

References

External links

1991 births
Living people
Sportspeople from Győr
Hungarian footballers
Association football midfielders
Hungary youth international footballers
Hungary under-21 international footballers
Győri ETO FC players
BFC Siófok players
Mezőkövesdi SE footballers
Gyirmót FC Győr players
Zalaegerszegi TE players
Nemzeti Bajnokság I players
Nemzeti Bajnokság II players